George Edward Alcorn Jr. (born March 22, 1940) is an American physicist, engineer, inventor, and professor. He taught at Howard University and the University of the District of Columbia, and worked primarily for IBM and NASA. He has over 30 inventions and 8 patents resulting in his induction into the National Inventors Hall of Fame in 2015.

Early life
Alcorn was born on March 22 1940, to Arletta Dixon Alcorn and George Edward Alcorn, Sr., in Indianapolis. They had another child, his younger brother Charles.

Education and Academic Career 
Alcorn received a four-year academic scholarship to Occidental College in Los Angeles, where he graduated with a Bachelor of Science in Physics. He received his degree with honors while earning eight letters in basketball and football. Alcorn earned a Master of Science in Nuclear Physics in 1963 from Howard University, after nine months of study. During the summers of 1962 and 1963, he worked as a research engineer for the Space Division of North American Rockwell. He was involved with the computer analysis of launch trajectories and orbital mechanics for Rockwell missiles, including the Titan I and II, the Saturn and the Nova. After earning a PhD in Molecular and Atomic Physics from Howard University in 1967, he went on to hold teaching positions in electrical engineering at Howard University and the University of the District of Columbia, eventually rising to the rank of full professor.

Private Industry Work 
After earning his PhD, Alcorn spent twelve years working in the private sector. He held positions as senior scientist at Philco-Ford, senior physicist at Perkin-Elmer, and advisory engineer at IBM.

Inventions 
Alcorn's best-known invention is the X-ray spectrometer, which earned him the NASA–Goddard Space Flight Center award for Inventor of the Year in 1984. Other significant inventions concerned plasma etching for semiconductor devices. In 1999, Alcorn was honored with an award from Government Executive magazine for developing the Airborne LIDAR Topographic Mapping System (ALTMS) in partnership with the Houston Advanced Research Center.

In 2015, Alcorn was inducted into the National Inventors Hall of Fame for his invention of the X-ray spectrometer.

Personal life 
Alcorn married his wife Marie DaVillier in 1969 and they have one son born in 1979. He later married Dorothy Green after the death of his first wife.

Patents issued 
 #4,172,004, 10/23/1979, Method for forming dense dry etched multi-level metallurgy with non-overlapped vias
 #4,201,800, 5/6/1980, Hardened photoresist master image mask process
 #4,289,834, 9/15/1981, Dense dry etched multi-level metallurgy with non-overlapped vias
 #4,472,728, 9/18/1984, Imaging X-ray spectrometer
 #4,543,442, 9/24/1985, GaAs Schottky barrier photo-responsive device and method of fabrication
 #4,618,380, 10/21/1986, Method of fabricating an imaging X-ray spectrometer
 #4,062,720, 12/13/1977, Process for forming ledge-free aluminum copper silicon conductor structure
 #3,986,912, 10/19/1976, Process for controlling the wall inclination of a plasma etched via hole

References

External links 
 George Edward Alcorn, African American History Program
NSBP honors Dr. George Alcorn, Jr.

1940 births
21st-century American physicists
Howard University alumni
Living people
African-American engineers
21st-century American engineers
African-American inventors
20th-century American inventors
Occidental College alumni
People from Indianapolis
21st-century African-American scientists
20th-century African-American people